or the Kanda Festival, is one of the three great Shinto festivals of Tokyo, along with the Fukagawa Matsuri and Sannō Matsuri. The festival started in the early 17th century as a celebration of Tokugawa Ieyasu's decisive victory  at the battle of Sekigahara and was continued as a display of the prosperity of the Tokugawa shogunate during the Edo period. Additionally, the current form of the festival is also held in honor  of the kami of Kanda Myōjin (Kanda Shrine).

The festival is held on the Saturday and Sunday closest to May 15, but since it alternates with the Sannō Matsuri, it is only held in odd-numbered years. On these years, the festival takes place at Kanda Shrine as well as in surrounding central Tokyo districts. Its prominent parades involve over 200 mikoshi, in addition to musicians, dancers, and floats.

See also 

 Culture of Japan
 Japanese calendar
 Japanese festivals
 Festivals in Tokyo

References

External links 
 

Religious festivals in Japan
Festivals in Tokyo
Japanese culture
Shinto festivals
Shinto in Tokyo
Parades in Japan
Spring (season) events in Japan